La Porcherie is a commune in the Haute-Vienne department in the Nouvelle-Aquitaine region in west-central France. La Porcherie station has rail connections to Brive-la-Gaillarde and Limoges.

Notable people
 Jacques-Arsène d'Arsonval (8 June 1851 – 31 December 1940): French physician and physicist, born in Château de la Borie, in La Porcherie; inventor of the moving-coil D'Arsonval galvanometer and the thermocouple ammeter. D'Arsonval was an important contributor to the emerging field of electrophysiology, the study of the effects of electricity on biological organisms, in the 19th century.

See also
Communes of the Haute-Vienne department

References

Communes of Haute-Vienne